Triteleia peduncularis is a monocot flowering plant in the genus Triteleia. Its common names include long-ray brodiaea and longray triteleia. It is endemic to California, where it occurs in the coastal and inland mountain ranges of the northern and central sections of the state. It grows in vernally moist habitat such as meadows, grassland, and vernal pools, often in areas with serpentine soils. It is a perennial wildflower growing from a corm. There are six stamens with white anthers, and the ovary at the center is yellow when the flower is fresh.

References

External links
Jepson Manual Treatment
Flora of North America
Photo gallery

peduncularis
Endemic flora of California
Natural history of the California chaparral and woodlands
Natural history of the California Coast Ranges
Flora without expected TNC conservation status